Facundo Díaz Acosta (born 15 December 2000) is an Argentine tennis player.

Díaz Acosta has a career high ATP singles ranking of 171 achieved on 27 February 2023. He also has a career high ATP doubles ranking of 173 achieved on 28 November 2022.

Díaz Acosta made his ATP main draw debut at the 2020 Argentina Open after receiving a wildcard for the singles and doubles main draws.

In May 2022, Díaz Acosta won his first Challenger title on clay, at the Dove Men+Care 2022 Challenger Coquimbo in Chile.

He recorded his first ATP win at the 2023 Argentina Open as a wildcard against his compatriot Federico Coria.

Challenger and World Tour finals

Singles: 8 (4–5)

Doubles: 8 (3–5)

References

External links

2000 births
Living people
Argentine male tennis players
Tennis players from Buenos Aires
Tennis players at the 2018 Summer Youth Olympics
Youth Olympic gold medalists for Argentina
21st-century Argentine people
South American Games gold medalists for Argentina
South American Games bronze medalists for Argentina
South American Games medalists in tennis
Competitors at the 2022 South American Games